Paul J. "PJ" DeBoy (born June 7, 1971) is an American actor and talk show host.

Early life
DeBoy was born in Baltimore, Maryland. He shares his name with his cousin, actor Paul DeBoy. He and Paul are cousins of Delegate Steven J. DeBoy Sr.

Career
DeBoy started his career in New York, where he performed with Miss Coco Peru and Kiki and Herb. He moved to Toronto in 1998. There, he hosted the show Locker Room on PrideVision and the late-night talk show Last Call on Toronto 1, and has appeared in various feature films such as Hedwig and the Angry Inch (2001), DoUlike2watch.com (2003), and Shortbus (2006).

References

External links

American male film actors
American television talk show hosts
American gay actors
Male actors from Maryland
Living people
1971 births
Radical Faeries members